The 1965 Lower Hutt mayoral election was part of the New Zealand local elections held that same year. The elections were held for the role of Mayor of Lower Hutt plus other local government positions including fifteen city councillors, also elected triennially. The polling was conducted using the standard first-past-the-post electoral method.

Background
The incumbent Mayor, Percy Dowse, sought re-election for a sixth term. He was returned unopposed as no other candidates nominated. Councillor John Kennedy-Good was encouraged by centre-right supporters to stand for mayor, but he declined to challenge Dowse, who he considered a good leader as well as a personal friend. The Citizens' Association, while not contesting the mayoralty, stood a full ticket of council candidates, the first time they had done so since 1953. This was to avoid a repeat of the 1959-62 council where Citizens' endorsed Ratepayer Independents won a majority on the council, but were hampered by having little in the way of agreed policy.

Councillor results

Notes

References

Mayoral elections in Lower Hutt
1965 elections in New Zealand
Politics of the Wellington Region